Le Manège d'Andrea (Andrea's Merry-go-round) is a carousel that was built by La Machine in Toulouse, France, in 1999 under the artistic and technical direction of François Delarozière. The ride was made with materials such as wood, leather, glass, iron, feathers, steel, tin and copper, together with several pieces from junk (motorbikes, electric fans, etc.). Every figure or seat has several mechanisms that can be activated by the children riding them. Some examples include a steering wheel on the Petit Poisson that activates gears that turns the head and tail of the fish, a lever on the seahorse that nods its head, and a crank on a steam engine that releases "steam".

External links
 Le Manège d'Andrea website 

Carousels
Amusement rides introduced in 1999